Harvey Vanzandt Higley (October 26, 1892 – October 15, 1986) was born in Cheshire, Ohio, and studied chemistry at the University of Wisconsin–Madison, graduating in October 1915. After serving in World War I he went to work for the Ansul Chemical Company of Marinette, Wisconsin, which specialized in making fire retardant chemicals. Higley eventually became the company's president (1938–48) and chairman of the board.

Higley was also active in politics and veteran's affairs. He joined the American Legion and served as Wisconsin State Commander from 1941 to 1942. From 1947 to 1953 he was chairman of the Republican Party of Wisconsin. In July 1953 President Dwight D. Eisenhower appointed Higley to be the Administrator of Veterans Affairs, where he helped to establish Veterans Day as a US Holiday. Higley held the position until November 1957 when he retired and returned to Wisconsin.

Higley died on October 15, 1986.

References

External links 
 Papers of Harvey V. Higley, Dwight D. Eisenhower Presidential Library
 
 

1892 births
1986 deaths
Businesspeople from Wisconsin
People from Gallia County, Ohio
People from Marinette, Wisconsin
People in the chemical industry
Republican Party of Wisconsin chairs
United States Department of Veterans Affairs officials
University of Wisconsin–Madison College of Letters and Science alumni
Wisconsin Republicans
20th-century American businesspeople
United States Army personnel of World War I